The Chartered Institute of Ergonomics and Human Factors (CIEHF – formerly The Ergonomics Society) is a United Kingdom-based professional society for ergonomists, human factors specialists, and those involved in user-centred design.

History
The Ergonomics Society was officially created on 17 September 1949 at a meeting of a number of academics at the Admiralty in London. Among the founding members were Frederic Bartlett, Donald Broadbent, W. E. Hick, Alan Welford, and J. S. Weiner.

In 1957 it started to publish the periodical journal Ergonomics. In partnership with Taylor & Francis and Elsevier, the Institute currently publishes six journals: Ergonomics, Applied Ergonomics, Behaviour and Information Technology, Theoretical Issues in Ergonomics Science, Injury Control and Safety Promotion and the Journal of Sports Sciences.

Following a meeting of the Privy Council on 27 May 2014, Her Majesty The Queen approved an Order granting a Royal Charter to the Institute. At the start of 2015, the Institute of Ergonomics and Human Factors became the Chartered Institute of Ergonomics and Human Factors. The charter confers recognition, at the highest level, of the uniqueness and value of its scientific discipline and the pre-eminent role of the Institute in representing both the discipline and the profession in the UK. The Royal Charter grants the right to the Institute "to award the protected status of “Chartered Ergonomist and Human Factors Specialist (C. ErgHF)” to those practising Registered Members and Fellows who remain in good standing with the Institute".

In October 2019 the Institute announced the appointment of its new CEO, Noorzaman Rashid.

Activities
The CIEHF makes a number of awards for accomplishments in ergonomics and human factors including the President's Medal and the Sir Frederic Bartlett Award for major contributions to ergonomics.

The Institute has a number Special Interest Groups (SIGs) for: Driving Ergonomics, Human-Computer Interaction, Healthcare Ergonomics, Sports Ergonomics, Nuclear Ergonomics, Occupational Safety and Motorcycle Ergonomics.

The CIEHF has its offices in Loughborough. By the end of 2013 there were 1700 members and at the end of 2014 the Institute had 294 members who were eligible for Chartered status, with many more about to become so. At the 2014 Conference, held at the Grand Harbour Hotel in Southampton, Professor Roger Haslam from Loughborough University was inaugurated as the new president of IEHF, taking over the role from Dr Richard Graveling. Professor Sarah Sharples, from the University of Nottingham and the Human Factors Research Group was also appointed as President Elect.

In 2008, to mark the journal's 50th year of publication, a special issue of "Ergonomics" (Volume 51, Number 1) was published, guest edited by Neville A. Stanton and Rob Stammers, covering the history of the society and including a re-print of the Ergonomics Research Society lecture given by Sir Frederick Bartlett in 1962.

The CIEHF has worked in partnership with other organisations and the UK Government to establish the Occupational Health & Safety Consultant Register.

References

External links 
 

Ergonomics organizations
Learned societies of the United Kingdom
Loughborough
Organizations established in 1949
Ergonomics and Human Factors
Research institutes in Leicestershire
1949 establishments in the United Kingdom